The 2011 Walsh Cup was a hurling competition played by the teams of Leinster GAA, a team from Connacht GAA and a team from Ulster GAA.  The competition differs from the Leinster Senior Hurling Championship as it also features further education colleges from both Leinster and Connacht and the winning team does not progress to another tournament at All-Ireland level. The four losers of the first round enter the Walsh Shield.  The winners of the Walsh Cup were Dublin, who defeated Kilkenny in the final, and the winners of the Walsh Shield were Offaly, who defeated Carlow in a replay, following the abandonment on the initial fixture in extra time.

Walsh Cup

First round

Quarter-finals

Semi-finals

Final

Walsh Shield
The Walsh Shield consists of the 4 losing teams from the first round of the Walsh Cup.

Semi-finals

Final

References 

Walsh Cup
Walsh Cup (hurling)